The 2012 OCT Championships was held from September 6 to 9 at the Oakville Curling Club in Oakville, Ontario as part of the 2012–13 Ontario Curling Tour. The event was held in a round robin format, with the purse for the men's event being CAD$23,400, and CAD $15,600 for the women's event.

Men

Teams

Round Robin Standings

Tiebreakers

Playoffs

Women

Teams

Round Robin Standings

Playoffs

External links

2012 in Ontario
OCT Championships
Oakville, Ontario